The footprint of a communications satellite is the ground area that its transponders offer coverage, and determines the satellite dish diameter required to receive each transponder's signal. There is usually a different map for each transponder (or group of transponders), as each may be aimed to cover different areas.

Footprint maps usually show either the estimated minimum satellite dish diameter required or the signal strength in each area measured in dBW.

External links
 Links to fleet information and footprints from SES.
 Links to interactive maps from Intelsat for their fleet of satellites.
 Links to interactive maps for SES World Skies's fleet of satellites.
 Link to maps for Russian Satellite Communications Company satellites
 Link to satellite footprints from SatBeams for Geostationary satellites
 Satellite footprints as images and on Google Earth

Satellites
Satellite broadcasting